The Very Best of Peter Allen: The Boy from Down Under is a greatest hits album by Australian singer-songwriter Peter Allen, released in Australia in August 1992 through A&M Records.

It was released less than two months after Allen's passing, on 18 June 1992.

Allen wrote or co-wrote all but two of the tracks on the album.

Reviews
Adrian Zupp of AllMusic gave the album 4.5 out of 5, saying; “His songwriting range  [from] tender ballads through to poppier fare and even campy fun numbers has rarely been rivaled …[and this album] captures the cream of Allen's career on one highly engaging disc.” Zupp concluded with “this album spans the moods and melodies that made Peter Allen such a special artist.”

Track listing
 "Honest Queen" (Peter Allen, Estelle Levitt) 3:16
 "Tenterfield Saddler" (Album Version) (Peter Allen) 3:37
 "Just Ask Me I've Been There" (Peter Allen) 4:23
 "Everything Old Is New Again" (Carole Bayer Sager, Peter Allen) 2:35
 "I Honestly Love You" (Jeff Barry, Peter Allen) 3:30
 "She Loves to Hear Music" (Album Version) (Carole Bayer Sager, Peter Allen) 3:22
 "I Go to Rio"  (Album Version)  (Adrienne Anderson, Peter Allen) 3:23
 "Quiet Please, There's a Lady On Stage" (Carole Bayer Sager, Peter Allen) 5:14
 "The More I See You" (Album Version) (Harry Warren, Mack Gordon) 3:35
 "I Could Have Been a Sailor" (Peter Allen) 3:53
 "Don't Wish Too Hard" (Carole Bayer Sager, Peter Allen) – 5:14
 "Don't Cry Out Loud" (Carole Bayer Sager, Peter Allen) 4:09
 "I'd Rather Leave While I'm in Love" (Carole Bayer Sager, Peter Allen) 3:40
 "One Step Over the Borderline" (David Foster, Peter Allen, Tom Keane) 3:54
 "Fly Away" (Carole Bayer Sager, David Foster, Peter Allen) 4:01
 "Bi-Coastal" (David Foster, Peter Allen, Tom Keane) 4:23
 "I Don’t Go Shopping" (Peter Allen, David Lasley) 4:35
 "I Still Call Australia Home" (Single Version) (Peter Allen) 3:56
 "You Haven’t Heard the Last of Me" (Eric Kaz, Tom Snow) 4:14
 "Arthur's Theme (Best That You Can Do)" (Recorded live at Carnegie Hall, 1985) (Peter Allen, Burt Bacharach, Christopher Cross, Carole Bayer Sager) 4:45

Charts
The Very Best of Peter Allen: The Boy from Down Under debuted on the Australian ARIA Charts at number 24, before peaking at number 16 the following week.

References

Peter Allen (musician) albums
1992 greatest hits albums
Compilation albums by Australian artists
A&M Records compilation albums
Albums produced by Richard Landis